Warsaw Community Unit School District 316 is a school district headquartered in Warsaw, Illinois.

It operates two schools, Warsaw Elementary School and Warsaw High School. Students at the junior high level grades 7th through 8th attend Nauvoo-Colusa Junior High School in the Nauvoo-Colusa Community Unit School District 325.

History
In 2007 the Warsaw school district and the Nauvoo-Colusa Community Unit School District 325 agreed to a plan in which Nauvoo-Colusa would close Nauvoo-Colusa High School and send its students to Warsaw High. In return the Warsaw district would close its junior high school and send its students to Nauvoo-Colusa Junior High School. On Tuesday February 12, 2008 voters in both districts approved the consolidation plans.

References

External links
 Warsaw Community Unit School District 316
 

School districts in Illinois
Education in Hancock County, Illinois